Fred (often stylized as FЯED) is a Nickelodeon media franchise based on the YouTube series and character of the same name created by Lucas Cruikshank. The films are produced by Derf Films, Varsity Pictures, The Collective and distributed by Lionsgate.

Similar to the YouTube series, the franchise follows a high-pitched, loud mouthed individual known as Fred Figglehorn and the misadventures he goes on in the real world while discovering various life lessons. When the first film was in production, various changes were made to the original series, most notably Fred's age being changed from a 6-year old child to a teenager.

Films

Fred: The Movie (2010)

Fred: The Movie aired on Nickelodeon on September 18, 2010. The film was directed by Clay Weiner and starred Lucas Cruikshank as Fred Figglehorn, Jennette McCurdy as Bertha, Pixie Lott as Judy, John Cena as Fred's imaginary dad, Siobhan Fallon Hogan as Fred's mom, and Jake Weary as Kevin. In this film, Fred wants to sing a duet with Judy (the girl of his dreams) when his arch-rival Kevin does. When he tries to go to Judy's house, he finds out that she has moved. So he embarks on an epic journey to find Judy. It was released on DVD on October 4, 2010. It was also released as a triple pack box set along with Fred 2: Night of the living Fred and Fred 3: Camp Fred. It is the only film in the series to have received a theatrical release.

Fred 2: Night of the Living Fred (2011)

Fred 2: Night of the Living Fred aired on Nickelodeon on October 22, 2011. The film was directed by Connor Tereport. Lucas Cruikshank, Jake Weary, Siobhan Fallon Hogan, and John Cena reprised their roles from the first film. Jennette McCurdy did not reprise her role as Bertha due to her being busy playing Sam on iCarly, and was replaced by Daniella Monet, who plays Trina on Victorious. Pixie Lott did not return to play Judy in the sequel for unknown reasons, although in the beginning of the film, Fred reveals that they broke up. New cast members include Seth Morris as Mr. Devlin, Carlos Knight as Diesel, and Ariel Winter as Talia. In this film, Fred's music teacher Mrs. Felson mysteriously disappears and Fred believes that the new music teacher, Mr. Devlin, killed her and thinks he is a vampire. So he goes on a wildly comic quest to expose Mr. Devlin's true identity before he turns Fred's "cul-de-sac" into a community of Bloodsuckers. It was released on DVD on February 6, 2012.

Fred 3: Camp Fred (2012)

Fred 3: Camp Fred aired on Nickelodeon on July 28, 2012. The film was directed by Joe Battisti. Lucas Cruikshank, Daniella Monet, Jake Weary, John Cena, Siobhan Fallon Hogan, and Carlos Knight reprise their roles from the second film. New cast members include Tom Arnold as Floyd Spunkmeyer, Adam Herschman as Murray, Joey Bragg as Magoo, and Steve Hytner as Camp Superior Counselor. In this film, Fred is out of school for the summer and hopes of going to Camp Superior. But his mother sends him to Camp Iwannapeepee because Camp Superior is too expensive. He learns from Floyd Spunkmeyer, counselor of Camp Iwannapeepee, that Camp Iwannapeepee and Camp Superior have been competing in the Summer Camp Games for 69 years and that Superior always won. And when Fred sees that his arch-rival Kevin is on the Camp Superior team, he must give a rousing speech and an epic musical number so Camp Iwannapeepee can win. This was the last film in the franchise.

Television series

Cast and crew

Cast
 A dark gray cell indicates the character was not featured in the film.
 An  indicates an appearance through previously recorded material.
 An  actor or actress portrayed an older version of their character.
 A  actor or actress was left uncredited for their role.
 A  indicates an actor or actress portrayed a younger version of their character.

Note: A gray cell indicates character did not appear in that medium.

Crew

Notes

Nickelodeon